Emblem of the Estonian SSR was adopted by the Stalinist authorities after the Soviet Union had occupied and annexed Estonia in August 1940. The emblem features a sunrise accented by sunbeams, the hammer and sickle for the victory of communism and the "world-wide socialist community of states", and the red star to represent the affiliation to communism. The emblem consists mainly of the colors red, yellow and green.

In the lower part the interlaced text reads, in Estonian Eesti NSV (for Eesti Nõukogude Sotsialistlik Vabariik, Estonian Soviet Socialist Republic). To the right, rye stalks encircle the center of the coat of arms, and to the left arcs a branch of a coniferous tree.

The banner bears the USSR State motto ("Proletarians of all countries, unite!")  in both Estonian (Kõigi maade proletaarlased, ühinege!) and Russian (Пролетарии всех стран, соединяйтесь! Proletarii vsekh stran, soyedinyaytes′!).

The official usage of the Soviet emblem was discontinued in Estonia in 1990, as the country switched back to the original coat of arms of independent Estonia along with other national symbols, display of which had been banned under the Soviet rule.

See also
 Coat of arms of Estonia

References 

Estonian SSR
Estonian Soviet Socialist Republic
Estonian SSR
Estonian SSR
Estonian SSR
Estonian SSR
Estonian SSR
Symbols introduced in 1940